The Nevada State Office of Energy, also known as the Nevada Governor's Office of Energy, is a Nevada state agency that focuses on managing and regulating Nevada's energy resources to ensure that they can meet the needs of local industries while also adhering to renewable energy and energy conservation principles. The current director of the Nevada Office of Energy is David Bobzien. The agency is headquartered in Carson City, Nevada.

History 
The agency was established in 1975 to promote efficient energy use in commercial and residential settings, and was originally known as the Nevada State Office of Energy. It underwent several changes in 1983 and 1993, before a select committee on energy was created in 2001. Not long after that, the committee became a permanent part of the Governor's Office, and became known as the Office of Energy.

Programs 
The following are the active programs in the Nevada Office of Energy as of 2021:

 Building Energy Codes
 Green Building Tax Abatements
 Home Energy Retrofit Opportunity for Seniors
 Lower Income Solar Energy Program (LISEP)
 Nevada Electric Highway
 Performance Contracting
 Project Funding Partnerships
 Renewable Energy Systems Determinations
 Renewable Energy Tax Abatements
 Revolving Loans for Renewable Energy, Energy Efficiency, and Energy Conservation

See also 

 Energy conservation in the United States
 Energy policy in the United States
 Renewable energy in the United States
 United States Department of Energy

References 

State agencies of Nevada
Energy conservation in the United States